Cola gigas is a species of flowering plant in the family Malvaceae. It is found only in Nigeria and is threatened by habitat loss.

References

gigas
Endemic flora of Nigeria
Vulnerable flora of Africa
Taxonomy articles created by Polbot